Medine Erkan (born 10 September 1995) is a Turkish women's football defender currently playing in the Turkish Women's Third League for ALG Spor with jersey number 8. She plays for the Turkish women's national team.

Career

Club

Medine Erkan received her license on February 9, 2010, for her hometown club Eskişehirspor, where she played four seasons in the Regional League, Women's Second League and finally Women's First League. In the 2013–14 season, she transferred to Derince Belediyespor. After one season, Derince Belediyespor withdrew from the league, and Erkan moved to play with Ataşehir Belediyespor in the 2014–15 season.

By end September 2019, she transferred to ALG Spor in Gaziantep. She enjoyed the 2021-22 Women's Super League champion title of her team.

International
Medine Erkan was admitted to the Turkey U-15, and debuted in the 2010 summer Youth Olympics held in Singapore, and capped four time.

On September 26, 2012, Erkan played for the first time at the Turkey U-19 appearing in the friendly match against Wales. She played in the 2013 UEFA Women's U-19 Championship First qualifying round – Group 5, 2013 Kuban Spring Tournament, 2014 UEFA Women's Under-19 Championship qualification – Group 10, 2014 Kuban Spring Tournament and 2014 UEFA Women's Under-19 Championship qualification – Group 5 matches. She capped 32 times for the women's national U-19 team.

Erkan was admitted to the national team and played in three matches of the UEFA Women's Euro 2017 qualifying Group 5.

Career statistics

Honours
 Turkish Women's First Football League
 Ataşehir Belediyespor
 Runners-up (2): 2014–15, 2015–16
 Third places (1): 2016–17

 ALG Spor
 Winners (2): 2019–20, 2021-22
 Third places (1): 2020–21

 Turkish Women's Second Football League
 Kocaeli Bayan FK
 Third places (1): 2018-19

References

External links

 
 

1995 births
ALG Spor players
Ataşehir Belediyespor players
Derince Belediyespor women's players
Eskişehirspor women's players
Footballers at the 2010 Summer Youth Olympics
Kocaeli Bayan FK players
Living people
Sportspeople from Eskişehir
Turkey women's international footballers
Turkish women's footballers
Women's association football defenders
Turkish Women's Football Super League players
20th-century Turkish sportswomen
21st-century Turkish sportswomen